The División Intermedia, the second division of Peruvian football (soccer) in 1926 until 1934, and the third division of Peruvian football (soccer) in 1935 until 1940. The tournament was played on a home-and-away round-robin basis.

On August 23, 1922, the Peruvian Football Federation (FPF) was founded and since 1926 tournaments began to be played under its organization. As the second category in the tournament system, the División Intermedia was found, which granted promotions to the champion ( and sometimes to the runner-up) to the Peruvian Primera División. Only the 1928 and 1931 editions did not give direct promotion but rather the classification to a promotion league.

In 1935 the División Intermedia became the third level of the tournament system below the Primera División A and the newly formed Primera División B. The first places obtained promotion to the 1936 Primera División Unificada de Lima y Callao and in the following years to the Liga Provincial de Lima.

It remained in dispute until 1940 and the following year it disappeared when the tournament system was reorganized with the creation of the Liga Regional de Lima y Callao.

Champions

As Second Division Tournament

As Third Division Tournament

Footnotes

A. At the end of the season, the 10 best-placed teams were directly promoted to 1928 Primera División. These teams were Sportivo Unión, Alianza Chorrillos, Santa Catalina, Lawn Tennis, Alberto Secada, Jorge Washington, Alianza Callao, José Olaya, Jorge Chávez (C) and Unión.

References

External links
 RSSSF

2
Peru
Defunct sports competitions in Peru